Bathyfautor is a genus of sea snails, marine gastropod mollusks in the family Calliostomatidae.

Species
Species within the genus Bathyfautor include:
 Bathyfautor caledonicus Marshall, 1995
 Bathyfautor coriolis Marshall, 1995
 Bathyfautor multispinosus (Schepman, 1908)
 Bathyfautor rapuhia Marshall, 1995
 Species brought into synonymy
 Bathyfautor caledonicum [sic]: synonym of Bathyfautor caledonicus Marshall, 1995
 Bathyfautor multispinosum [sic]: synonym of Bathyfautor multispinosus (Schepman, 1908)

References

External links

 
Calliostomatidae
Gastropod genera